Lucia Poli (born 14 June 1940), is an Italian actress, playwright and stage director.

Life and career 
Born in Florence, the sister of the actor Paolo, Poli began her career in 1970 with the children's theater. In the mid-1970s she formed her own stage company and started writing her works, characterized by social and feminist themes and by a peculiar comic verve, filled with paradoxical and satirical moods.

Poli was also active on radio, television and cinema; in 1997 she won the Nastro d'Argento for best supporting actress for her performance in the Ugo Chiti's comedy film Albergo Roma.

References

External links 

Italian film actresses
Italian television actresses
1940 births
People from Treviso
Italian stage actresses
Living people